Alkimos was a Greek-owned merchant ship which was wrecked on the coast north of Perth, Western Australia in 1963. A nearby locality was later named after the vessel. The wreck is a popular diving venue.

History 
The ship was built during World War II by Bethlehem-Fairfield Shipyards in Baltimore as part of the United States' Liberty ship program and was originally scheduled to be named George M. Shriver. It is said to be haunted after several workers were unintentionally trapped in riveted-up compartments aboard the ship. These unfortunate workers were found a day after, suffocating to their deaths in these sealed areas.  It was launched on 11 October 1943. However, on 20 October, the vessel was reassigned to the Norwegian Shipping & Trade Mission, was re-christened Viggo Hansteen. and saw war service for about 18 months, primarily in the Mediterranean and was crewed by mariners of various nationalities. It served as a troopship and transported cargo, in convoys that were sometimes attacked by German aircraft and U-boats.

A murder-suicide took place on board Viggo Hansteen in August 1944, while the ship was at Naples (some sources say Piombino); Canadian radio operator Maude Steane is reported to have been shot by another crew member in his cabin, who then killed himself.

At 2.30 am on 24 April 1952, the Viggo Hansteen while on a voyage from London, via Panama, to Port Chalmers and Wellington with new British cars and bagged cement ran aground two miles northeast of the Katiki Point Lighthouse near Moeraki.  The Port Chalmers based tug Dunedin was dispatched to the scene and by 3.16 pm the tug had refloated the vessel which was only slightly damaged and escorted it to port.

The vessel was sold in 1953 to Greek owned Faros Shipping, of London who renamed it Alkimos, after a word meaning "strong" and a Greek god, Álkimos. The ship operated under the flag of Panama until 1959 when it was transferred to Greek registry.

Loss 
The vessel was on a voyage from Jakarta to Bunbury when it struck a reef on the 19 March 1963 near Beagle Island off the Western Australian coast. It was salvaged and towed to Fremantle, the port city for Perth, Western Australia, where it underwent repairs for two months.

After the settlement of a dispute concerning payment for the repairs, Alkimos left Fremantle under tow by an ocean-going tug, Pacific Reserve from Hong Kong. Only a few hours out of port, on 31 May 1963, the tow line gave way and Alkimos was driven onto the shore. Although the ship remained intact, it could not be floated off at that time, and so it was filled with water to secure it in place and left in the charge of an on-board caretaker.

Another tug, Pacific Star, under command of Captain E.R. Francisco, returned in January 1964 and the ship was refloated on 14 February, but the planned journey to Manila had hardly begun when the tug was seized a week later at sea by authorities and Alkimos was left anchored. On 2 May, the vessel broke anchor and was driven onto the Eglinton Rocks near present-day Yanchep, Western Australia. On this occasion it was more severely damaged, and all thought of salvaging it intact was abandoned.

It was later sold by the owners for scrap. However, in 1969, salvage workers were driven off the wreck by a fire, and each time they returned, the fire started again. After that time, the partly dismantled remains of the ship sat in several metres of water, visible to visitors, before gradually disintegrating.

Footnotes

References
The Sunday Times Magazine (Perth), 19 March 2006, p. 14
 ABC Television program Stateline (Transcript) 
 Shipwrecks of the Wanneroo Coast 
 Photo of the Alkimos in 1969

External links 
 GoogleMaps location and image of the Alkimos Wreck

Liberty ships
Ships built in Sparrows Point, Maryland
Ships of Nortraship
Cargo ships of Greece
Shipwrecks of Western Australia
Maritime incidents in 1963
Maritime incidents in 1964
1943 ships
Steamships of Greece
World War II merchant ships of the United States
Steamships of the United States
Steamships of Norway
World War II merchant ships of Norway
Ghost ships